Organ Needle is the highest point of the Organ Mountains in the south-central part of the U.S. state of New Mexico. It is at the southeast end of a narrow ridge of vertically jointed granite (more specifically, quartz monzonite) called The Needles.

Organ Needle is one of the most dramatic peaks in the state. True to its name, it is a steep, pointed summit.

References 

Mountains of New Mexico
Landforms of Doña Ana County, New Mexico
Organ Mountains–Desert Peaks National Monument
Mountains of Doña Ana County, New Mexico